Frensham School is an independent non-denominational comprehensive single-sex preschool, primary, and secondary day and boarding school for girls, located at Mittagong, in the Southern Highlands region of New South Wales, Australia.

Established in 1913 by Winifred West, the school has a non-selective enrolment policy and currently caters for approximately 300 students from Years 7 to 12, including 222 boarders. Students come to Frensham from Sydney, rural New South Wales, interstate, overseas and the
Southern Highlands. The school is governed by the Winifred West Schools Limited, along with Miss West's other two schools, Sturt School Craft Centre and Gib Gate Primary school.

Frensham is affiliated with the Boarding Schools' Association of the United Kingdom, the Association of Heads of Independent Schools of Australia (AHISA), the Australian Boarding Schools' Association (ABSA), the Alliance of Girls' Schools Australasia (AGSA), and is a founding member of the Association of Heads of Independent Girls' Schools (AHIGS).

History 
Frensham was founded by Winifred Mary West (1881–1971) on 17 July 1913, with three students and five teaching staff.

West first came to Australia in 1907, where she met Phyllis Clubbe, and the two soon after considered the founding of a school. To prepare for this they returned to England, where West furthered her experience in teaching, and Clubbe undertook teacher training. In 1912, they returned to Australia to begin the search for a suitable site, preferably a country region with an invigorating climate, within a reasonable distance of Sydney. On 1 June 1913, "Y Berth", a house belonging to Mr Tooth, was leased for five years with the option to purchase. The school was named after West's birthplace, Frensham in Surrey.

Based on word-of-mouth, the school population had grown to 100 by 1918, and continued to grow to 250 by 1943, and 330 in 1963. In 1934, photographer Harold Cazneaux published a book of photographs of the students and the school titled The Frensham Book. This collection is now in the National Library of Australia, and formed part of a National Library public exhibition of his photography. S. E. Emilsen wrote another book on the school in 1988.

In 1941, Miss West established the Sturt Craft Centre for local students, teaching weaving, spinning and carpentry as a community service. Eventually other crafts such as pottery, jewellery, textiles and screenprinting were introduced. Today, Sturt also hosts annual Summer and Winter schools focussing on the arts in January and July. The Sturt School for Wood was established in 1985, and runs full-time courses for designer makers of fine furniture. Gib Gate was established as a preparatory school for Frensham in 1954. The school had planned to open a preparatory school named "Little Frensham" in 1939, but the grounds were destroyed by the 1939 bushfires. In 1970, Gib Gate became co-educational, catering for day students from pre-school to Year 6, with boarding available in Years 4, 5 and 6.

In the mid 1970s, Frensham established a mass recruitment advertising campaign to achieve an increase in attendance, as the school faced unfavourable outcomes in net profit. The campaign lasted approximately five years, and by 1983 enrolments had doubled.

Headmistresses

Governance 
In 1917, Winifred West established a school Council consisting of staff, the head girl and prefects, old girls and community representatives. In 1932, Frensham School Limited was formed in order to provide for the school after the death of West, with the Council becoming the executive body. A Board of Governors became the executive body in 1952, with the council becoming an advisory body. Frensham School Limited was renamed as Winifred West Schools Limited in 1954, as recognition of Winifred West's other two schools, Sturt School and Gib Gate.

Notable alumnae
Frensham School's Old Girls (alumnae) may elect to join the Frensham Fellowship. The Frensham Fellowship was established in 1918, as a way of linking past and present students. Membership is open to former students and staff, with honorary membership offered to current staff and school prefects. Some notable Old Girls include:

Media, entertainment and the arts

 Marion Hall Best – interior designer
 Helen Blaxland  – charity fundraiser, heritage conservationist, skilful flower arranger and nonfiction writer
 Eleanor Cullis-Hill – architect
 Rosemary Dobson  – author and poet with 13 published works; Winner of awards including a 1996 Australia Council Writer's Emeritus Award
 Henrietta Drake-Brockman – playwright; 1938 winner of a Sesquicentenary Celebration Prize for best full-length play for Men Without Wives; Winner of a Bulletin short story prize
Elizabeth Fell – activist, journalist, academic, feminist and public intellectual
 Nancy Keesing  – author of 26 volumes of poetry and fiction, chaired the Australia Council and the State Library of NSW
 Annette Macarthur-Onslow – author and illustrator; Winner of the Book of the Year Award of the Children's Book Council for Uhu (1970)
 Kate McClymont – investigative journalist at The Sydney Morning Herald
 Penny Meagher – painter
 Joan Phipson  – author of 25 novels, including The Family Conspiracy; Winner of the Australian Children's Book of the Year (1963), and the New York Herald Tribune Children's Spring Book Festival Award (1964)
 Babette Smith  – colonial historian and mediator
Betty Who – stage name of Jessica Anne Newham, pop artist
 Zoë Young – Archibald Prize finalist, 2014

Medicine and science
Dr Catherine Hamlin   – obstetrician and gynaecologist; co-founder of the Addis Ababa Fistula Hospital in Ethiopia; pioneer in fistula surgery; 1999 nominee for the Nobel Peace Prize

Politics, public service and the law
 Ruth Dobson   – former Ambassador to Denmark and the Republic of Ireland.
 Rosemary Foot   – former Deputy Leader of the NSW Liberal Party. First woman to be elected to a leadership position of a major party in a lower house anywhere in Australia
 Jane Mathews  – judge of the Supreme Court of New South Wales.
 Lucy Hughes Turnbull – a former Lord Mayor of Sydney (2003–2004); wife of Australian Prime Minister Malcolm Turnbull; Company Director and author (she also attended Kincoppal-Rose Bay, School of the Sacred Heart, Sydney)

Sport and aviation
 Christine Davy  – former alpine skier who competed at the 1956 and 1960 Winter Olympics and pioneering female airline pilot who was the first Australian woman to hold a 1st Class Air Transport Pilot's Licence
 Jessica Young, member of the Israeli National Netball Team, who competed at the 2017 Netball Europe Championships, Aberdeen and 2017 Maccabiah Games

Education
 Annabel Chauncey – founder of School For Life Foundation
Patience Hawker  – co-founder of Stawell School for girls in South Australia

See also 

 List of non-government schools in New South Wales
List of boarding schools in Australia

References

Further reading
 Curd, L.M. 1938. Frensham: The First Twenty-five Years. Frensham School, Mittagong.
 Emilsen, S.E. 1988. Frensham: An Historical Perspective. Winifred West Schools, Mittagong.
 Svensen, J. 1993. Lasting Influences: Memories of Frensham 1938–1965. Molong Write Way, Molong, NSW.
 Tuckey, E. 1963. Fifty years at Frensham: A history of an Australian School. Winifred West Schools, Mittagong.

External links

 Frensham School website

1913 establishments in Australia
Association of Heads of Independent Girls' Schools
Boarding schools in New South Wales
Buildings and structures awarded the Sir John Sulman Medal
Educational institutions established in 1913
Girls' schools in New South Wales
Private secondary schools in New South Wales
Mittagong, New South Wales
Private primary schools in New South Wales
Alliance of Girls' Schools Australasia